The Italian cruiser Vettor Pisani was the name ship of her class of two armored cruisers built for the Royal Italian Navy (Regia Marina) in the 1890s. She often served as a flagship during her career and frequently served overseas. On one of these deployments, the ship received a radio message from Peking, one of the first long-range radio transmissions to a ship. Vettor Pisani participated in the Boxer Rebellion of 1900 and the Italo-Turkish War of 1911–12, during which her admiral nearly caused a diplomatic incident with the Austro-Hungarian Empire. During World War I, her activities were limited by the threat of Austro-Hungarian submarines and she was converted into a repair ship in 1916. Vettor Pisani was stricken from the Navy List in 1920 and scrapped later that year.

Design and description

The Vettor Pisani-class ships had a complement of 28 officers and 472 to 476 enlisted men.

The ship was powered by two vertical triple-expansion steam engines, each driving one propeller shaft. Steam for the engines was supplied by eight Scotch marine boilers.

The main armament of the Vettor Pisani-class ships consisted of twelve quick-firing (QF) Cannone da 152/40 A Modello 1891 guns in single mounts. All of these guns were mounted on the broadside, eight on the upper deck and four at the corners of the central citadel in armored casemates. Single QF Cannone da 120/40 A Modello 1891 guns were mounted in the bow and stern and the remaining two  guns were positioned on the main deck between the  guns. For defense against torpedo boats, the ship carried fourteen QF  Hotchkiss guns and eight QF  Hotchkiss guns. The ship was also equipped with four  torpedo tubes.

The upper strake of armor was also 15 cm thick and protected just the middle of the ship, up to the height of the upper deck. The curved armored deck was 3.7 cm thick. The conning tower armor was also 15 cm thick and each 15.2 cm gun was protected by a  gun shield.

Construction and career
Vettor Pisani, named after the eponymous Venetian admiral, was laid down on 7 December 1892 at the Royal Shipyard in Castellammare di Stabia. The ship was launched on 14 August 1895 and completed on 1 April 1899. She was the flagship of Rear Admiral Candiani, commander of the Cruising Squadron dispatched to China in 1900 during the Boxer Rebellion. Vettor Pisani arrived there on 20 August and made port visits in Japan, Korea and Vladivostok before departing the area on 29 November 1901. She arrived at La Spezia in February 1902, but only remained in Italian waters for a year before departing for another year-long cruise to the Far East on 15 April 1903. On 14 October, the Italian Legation in Peking successfully radioed the ship off the coast of China, one of the first long-range radio transmissions to a ship. The cruiser arrived back in Italy on 13 June 1904. Nothing is known of her activities until May – June 1908 when Vettor Pisani made a short cruise in Greek waters.

When the Italo-Turkish War of 1911–12 began on 29 September 1911, Vettor Pisani was the flagship of Rear-Admiral Prince Luigi Amedeo, Duke of the Abruzzi, Inspector of Torpedo Boats. His command, the Division of the Inspector of Torpedo Boats, was deployed in the Adriatic Sea and five of his destroyers encountered two Ottoman torpedo boats in the Ionian Sea only an hour after war was declared. One of the Ottoman ships was able to take shelter under the protection of the fortifications in Prevesa while the other was forced to beach itself with nine men killed by Italian gunfire. The Italians blockaded the port and the Duke requested permission to issue an ultimatum for the Ottoman authorities to surrender the ship lest he bombard the city with Vettor Pisani and the battleship . Protests in early October over Italian interference in Ottoman-controlled Albania by the Austro-Hungarian Empire forced the Italians to abandon operations there and permission was denied. The cruiser was based in Taranto and Brindisi for much of December.

In mid-April 1912, the division escorted the 1st, 2nd and 4th Divisions of the Italian fleet from Taranto to the eastern Aegean Sea where it bombarded the fortifications defending the Dardanelles to little effect before the main body departed for Italy on the 19th. Several months later, Vettor Pisani supported an unsuccessful sortie by five torpedo boats into the Dardanelles in search of the Ottoman fleet on the night of 18/19 July.

Obsolescent by the beginning of World War I, Vettor Pisani was not very active during the war. She spent the war in the Adriatic and participated in an abortive attempt in mid-1915 to bombard a rail line near Ragusa Vecchia on the Dalmatian coast. An Austro-Hungarian submarine, U-4, intercepted the Italian ships and sank the armored cruiser . The loss of Giuseppe Garibaldi and the sinking of the armored cruiser  by another submarine on 7 July severely restricted the activities of the other ships based at Venice. She subsequently became a repair ship in 1916 and was stricken from the Navy List on 2 January 1920. Vettor Pisani was sold for scrap and broken up beginning on 13 March.

Notes

Footnotes

References

External links
 Vettor Pisani Marina Militare website

Vettor Pisani-class cruisers
1896 ships
Ships built in Castellammare di Stabia
World War I cruisers of Italy